Live Erleben (Live Experience) is the first live album from German electronical musician, composer and producer Christopher von Deylen under his Schiller alias. The CD features several live versions of the tracks found on the 2003 Schiller album Leben / Life. Recorded live at the Schiller 'Er-Leben-Tour' 2004, 22 April 2004, Phillipshalle Düsseldorf (Germany). It's also available as a DVD version.

Schiller used a daf which is one of the most powerful Persian percussive instruments on this album (The Smile ft Sarah Brightman)

The album achieved gold status in Germany in 2016.

Track listing

References

External links 
 http://www.discogs.com/Schiller-Live-ErLeben/release/1949635

2004 live albums
Schiller (band) albums